Dahlgreen Courts is a historic structure located in the Brookland neighborhood in the Northeast quadrant of Washington, D.C.  The complex is made up of two buildings that contain 96 units. They were designed by George T. Santmyers and they were completed in stages between 1927 and 1929.  The complex was listed on both the District of Columbia Inventory of Historic Sites and on the National Register of Historic Places in 2010.

References

Brookland (Washington, D.C.)
Residential buildings completed in 1929
Apartment buildings in Washington, D.C.
Residential buildings on the National Register of Historic Places in Washington, D.C.